The Women's 100m Freestyle event at the 2006 Central American and Caribbean Games occurred on Saturday, July 22, 2006, at the S.U. Pedro de Heredia Aquatic Complex in Cartagena, Colombia.

Records

Results

Final

Preliminaries

References

Results: 2006 CACs--Swimming: Women's 100 Freestyle--prelims from the official website of the 2006 Central American and Caribbean Games; retrieved 2009-07-04.
Results: 2006 CACs--Swimming: Women's 100 Freestyle--finals from the official website of the 2006 Central American and Caribbean Games; retrieved 2009-07-04.

Freestyle, Women's 100m
2006 in women's swimming